Events in 1994 in animation. 



Events

January
 January 3: The first episode of Once Upon a Time... The Discoverers, produced by Albert Barillé, airs.
 January 6: The Simpsons episode "Homer the Vigilante" first airs, guest starring Sam Neill. 
 January 18: The Peanuts special You're in the Super Bowl, Charlie Brown first airs.
 January 26: The first episode of The Critic airs. It will gain a cult following.

February
 February 3: The Simpsons episode "Bart Gets Famous" first airs, guest starring Conan O'Brien. 
 February 5: The first episode of Where on Earth is Carmen Sandiego? airs.
 February 10: The Simpsons episode "Homer and Apu" first airs, guest starring James Woods. 
 February 17: The Simpsons episode "Lisa vs. Malibu Stacy" first airs, guest starring Kathleen Turner. 
 February 24: The Simpsons episode "Deep Space Homer" first airs, guest starring Buzz Aldrin and James Taylor.

March
 March 5: The first episode of Duckman airs. The show will gain a cult following.
 March 9: The first episode of The Busy World of Richard Scarry airs.
 March 17: The Simpsons episode "Homer Loves Flanders" airs.
 March 21: 66th Academy Awards:
 The Wallace and Gromit short film The Wrong Trousers by Nick Park wins the Academy Award for Best Animated Short Film.
 March 30: Don Bluth and Gary Goldman's Thumbelina premiers.
 March 31: The Simpsons episode "Bart Gets an Elephant" first airs.

April
 April 14: The Simpsons episode Burns' Heir first airs.
 April 15: The first episode of Space Ghost Coast to Coast airs.
 April 28: The 100th episode of The Simpsons, "Sweet Seymour Skinner's Baadasssss Song", first airs.

May
 May 5: The Simpsons episode "The Boy Who Knew Too Much" first airs.
 May 12: The Simpsons episode "Lady Bouvier's Lover" first airs.
 May 19: The Simpsons episode "Secrets of a Successful Marriage" first airs.
 May 20: The Return of Jafar first releases, being the first direct-to-video film by the Walt Disney Company.

June
 June 13: The first episode of Dr. Zitbag's Transylvania Pet Shop airs.
 June 15: The Lion King, produced by the Walt Disney Company, is first released.

July
 July 11: PBS repackaged their existing children's educational programming as a new block called "PTV Park".
 July 16: Isao Takahata's Pom Poko premiers.

September
 September 4: The Simpsons episode "Bart of Darkness" first airs.
 September 5: The first episode of Aladdin: The Series airs.
 September 10: 
 The first episodes of ReBoot and The Magic School Bus air.
 Jan Švankmajer's Faust premiers.
 September 11: 
 The Simpsons episode "Lisa's Rival" first airs, guest starring Winona Ryder.
 September 24: The first episodes of Fantastic Four and Iron Man air.
 September 25: The Simpsons episode "Another Simpsons Clip Show" first airs.
 September 29: Asterix Conquers America, the sixth Astérix film, premiers.

October
 October 2: The Simpsons episode "Itchy & Scratchy Land" first airs.
 October 7: Don Bluth's A Troll in Central Park premiers.
 October 9: The Simpsons episode "Sideshow Bob Roberts" first airs, in which Sideshow Bob runs for mayor. It also guest stars Dr. Demento and Larry King.
 October 7: The first episode of The Itsy Bitsy Spider airs.
 October 12: DreamWorks Animation is founded along with DreamWorks Pictures.
 October 21: Cartoon Network Studios is founded.
 October 24: The first episode of Gargoyles airs.
 October 29: The first episode of Aaahh!! Real Monsters airs.
 October 30: The Simpsons episode "Treehouse of Horror V" first airs, guest starring James Earl Jones.

November
 November 3: The German animated feature Felidae is first released. It will gain cult status later.
 November 6: The Simpsons episode "Bart's Girlfriend" first airs, guest starring Meryl Streep.
 November 13: The Simpsons episode "Lisa on Ice" first airs.
 November 15: Pinocchio and the 1933 Betty Boop cartoon Snow White are added to the National Film Registry.
 November 18: The film The Swan Princess premieres.
 November 19: The first episode of Spider-Man airs.
 November 23: The mix between live-action and animation, The Pagemaster, starring Macaulay Culkin premiers.
 November 27: The Simpsons episode "Homer Badman" first airs, in which Homer gets caught up in a sexual harassment scandal. It also guest stars Dennis Franz.

December
 December 4: 
 The film Sailor Moon S: The Movie premiers.
 The Simpsons episode "Grampa vs. Sexual Inadequacy" first airs.
 December 18: The Simpsons episode "Fear of Flying" first airs, guest starring Anne Bancroft and the cast of Cheers including Ted Danson, Woody Harrelson, Rhea Perlman, John Ratzenberger, and George Wendt.

Specific date unknown
 The first episode of Katie and Orbie airs.
 Janie Geiser's The Red Book is first released.

Films released

 January 1 - Goldilocks and the Three Bears (Australia)
 January 22 - Kattobase! Dreamers ―Carp Tanjō Monogatari― (Japan)
 February 21 - Urotsukidōji III: Return of the Overfiend Director's Edition (Japan)
 March 12:
 Doraemon: Nobita's Three Visionary Swordsmen (Japan)
 Dragon Ball Z: Broly – Second Coming (Japan)
 March 19 - Happy, the Littlest Bunny (United States and Japan)
 March 21 - Plastic Little (Japan)
 March 30 - Thumbelina (United States and Ireland)
 April 3 - Yogi the Easter Bear (United States)
 April 9:
 Sangokushi (dai 3-bu): Harukanaru Taichi (Japan)
 Yu Yu Hakusho the Movie: Poltergeist Report (Japan)
 April 15 - Cinderella (United States and Japan)
 April 23 - Crayon Shin-chan: The Secret Treasure of Buri Buri Kingdom (Japan)
 April 30 - The Magic Flute (United States)
 May 20 - The Return of Jafar (United States)
 May 24 - Dengeki Oshioki Musume Gōtaman: Gōtaman Tanjō-hen (Japan)
 June 11 - J League o 100-bai Tanoshiku Miru Hōhō!! (Japan)
 June 15 - The Lion King (United States)
 June 19 - Dot in Space (Australia)
 June 21 - The Jungle King (United States)
 July 9:
 Dragon Ball Z: Bio-Broly (Japan)
 Slam Dunk: Conquer the Nation, Hanamichi Sakuragi! (Japan)
 July 16:
 Fatal Fury: The Motion Picture (Japan)
 The Life of Guskou Budori (Japan)
 Pom Poko (Japan)
 Soreike! Anpanman Ririkaru Majikaru Mahō no Gakkō (Japan)
 July 20 - Leo the Lion: King of the Jungle (United States and Japan)
 July 23 - Super Kid (South Korea)
 July 29 - Lupin III: Dragon of Doom (Japan)
 August 6 - Street Fighter II: The Animated Movie (Japan)
 August 19 - Once Upon a Time (Norway)
 August 20 - Ghost Sweeper Mikami: The Great Paradise Battle!! (Japan)
 August 21:
 Baki the Grappler (Japan)
 Captain Tsubasa: The Most Powerful Opponent! Holland Youth (Japan)
 August 23 - VeggieTales: God Wants Me to Forgive Them?!? (United States)
 August 25 - Cosmic Fantasy: Galaxy Cougar's Trap (Japan)
 September 3 - Scooby-Doo in Arabian Nights (United States)
 September 8 - Samurai Shodown: The Motion Picture (Japan)
 September 29 - Asterix Conquers America (Germany and France)
 October 4:
 The Night Before Christmas (United States)
 Taxandria (Belgium)
 October 7 - A Troll in Central Park (United States)
 October 8 - Darkside Blues (Japan)
 October 19:
 Pocahontas (United States and Japan)
 The Story of Christmas (United States and France)
 October 24 - Dengeki Oshioki Musume Gōtaman R: Ai to Kanashimi no Final Battle (Japan)
 October 25 - The Gate to the Mind's Eye (United States)
 November 3 - Felidae (Germany)
 November 5:
 Blue Seagull (South Korea)
 A Christmas Carol (United States and Japan)
 The Secret Garden (Japan)
 November 18 - The Swan Princess (United States)
 November 21 - A Flintstones Christmas Carol (United States)
 November 23 - The Pagemaster (United States)
 December 4 - Sailor Moon S: The Movie (Japan)
 December 13 - The Land Before Time II: The Great Valley Adventure (United States)
 December 23 - The Hero of Two Worlds (Italy)
 Specific date unknown:
 The Land Surveyor (Russia)
 The Return of the North Wind (Spain)

Television series debuts

Television series endings

Births

January
 January 24: Booboo Stewart, American actor (voice of Jay in Descendants: Wicked World, Jack O'Lantern in the Spider-Man episode "Bring on the Bad Guys", Kevin in the Big City Greens episode "Big Resolution").
 January 29: Ayane Sakura, Japanese actress (voice of Ochaco Uraraka / Uravity in My Hero Academia, Secre Swallowtail in Black Clover, Yotsuba Nakano in The Quintessential Quintuplets, Natsumi Koshigaya in Non Non Biyori, Gabi Braun in Attack on Titan, Ayane in Weathering With You, Tsubaki Sawabe in Your Lie in April, Iroha Isshiki in My Youth Romantic Comedy Is Wrong, As I Expected, Suzuka Dairenji in Tokyo Ravens,  Nagato-class, Sendai-class, Kuma, Tama, Shimakaze in Kantai Collection, Cocoa Hoto in Is the Order a Rabbit?, Ran Mitake in BanG Dream!, Clarisse in Granblue Fantasy, Hasuki Komai in Boarding School Juliet, Nao Tomori in Charlotte, Rinne in Pretty Rhythm: Rainbow Live and King of Prism, Prinz Eugen in Azur Lane, dub voice of Ms. Chalice in The Cuphead Show!).

February
 February 11: Dominic Janes, American former child actor (portrayed Jimmy in Re-Animated and Out of Jimmy's Head, voice of Sammy Paré / Squid Boy in Wolverine and the X-Men).
 February 23: Dakota Fanning, American actress (voice of young Kim Possible in Kim Possible: A Sitch in Time, Satsuki Kusakabe in My Neighbor Totoro, Lilo in Lilo & Stitch 2: Stitch Has a Glitch, the title character in Coraline, young Wonder Woman in the Justice League Unlimited episode "Kid Stuff").
 February 27: Rie Takahashi, Japanese voice actress and singer (voice of Miki Naoki in School-Live!, Mash Kyrielight in Fate/Grand Order, Megumin in KonoSuba, Mirai Asahina/Cure Miracle in Witchy PreCure!, Emilia in Re:Zero − Starting Life in Another World, Futaba Ichinose in Seiyu's Life!, Takagi in Teasing Master Takagi-san, Dan Kouzo in Bakugan: Battle Planet, Sumi Sakurasawa in Rent-A-Girlfriend).

March
 March 1: Justin Bieber, Canadian singer (voice of A.Z. in Angelina Ballerina: The Next Steps, himself in The Simpsons episode "The Fabulous Faker Boy").
 March 10: Alan Ituriel, Mexican cartoonist and voice actor (creator and voice of Black Hat in Villainous).
 March 26: AJ Bridel, Canadian actress and singer (voice of Pipp Petals in My Little Pony: Make Your Mark and My Little Pony: Tell Your Tale).

April
 April 8: Johnny LaZebnik, American production assistant (Norman Picklestripes), television writer and son of Rob LaZebnik (Norman Picklestripes, The Simpsons, Ridley Jones, Rugrats, Eureka!).
 April 15: Arif Zahir, American actor, musician, and internet personality (continued voice of Cleveland Brown in Family Guy).
 April 16: Liliana Mumy, American actress (voice of Leni Loud in The Loud House, Twinkle in Higglytown Heroes, Panini in Chowder, Beth Tezuka in Bravest Warriors, continued voice of Mertle Edmonds in the Lilo & Stitch franchise).
 April 24: Jordan Fisher, American actor and musician (voice of Sea Hawk in She-Ra and the Princesses of Power, Finley in Archibald's Next Big Thing, Robaire in Turning Red).

May
 May 4: Alexander Gould, American actor (voice of Nemo in Finding Nemo, Bambi in Bambi II, Jimmy Olsen in Superman: Unbound, Carl in Finding Dory).

June 
 June 16: Caitlyn Taylor Love, American actress and musician (voice of Ava Ayala / White Tiger in Ultimate Spider-Man).

July 
 July 24: Jaboukie Young-White, American actor and comedian (voice of McNelly in Ralph Breaks the Internet, Ethan Clade in Strange World, Mbita in Baymax!).

August 
 August 23: Francesca Reale, American actress (voice of Sydnie in Entergalactic, Aizmuth in Strange World).
 August 29: Eduardo Franco, American comedic actor (voice of DJ Catnip in Gabby's Dollhouse, Pako in Koati).

September 
 September 25: Jansen Panettiere, American actor (voice of Truman X in The X's, Periwinkle in season 6 of Blue's Clues, young Rodney Copperbottom in Robots, Shovelmouth Boy in Ice Age: The Meltdown), (d. 2023).
 September 29: Halsey, American singer (voice of Wonder Woman in Teen Titans Go! To the Movies, Porsha Crystal in Sing 2, herself in the American Dad! episode "A Nice Night for a Drive" and the Scooby-Doo and Guess Who? episode "The New York Underground!").

November 
 November 15: Alejandro Saab, American voice actor (voice of Tamotsu Denkigai in Akiba's Trip: The Animation, Takezo Kurata in Kono Oto Tomare! Sounds of Life, Kazuki Yasaka in Sarazanmai, Izumi Miyamura in Horimiya, Tatsuya Shiba in The Irregular at Magic High School, Leon in Pokémon Journeys: The Series, Marc Anciel in season 4 of Miraculous: Tales of Ladybug & Cat Noir).

December
 December 3: Jake T. Austin, American actor (voice of Diego in Dora the Explorer and seasons 1-3 of Go, Diego, Go!, Nicky in The Ant Bully, Fernando in Rio and Rio 2, Alex in The Emoji Movie, Blue Beetle in Justice League Action, Justice League vs. Teen Titans, and Teen Titans: The Judas Contract).
 December 10: Kayli Mills, American actress (voice of Emilia in Re:Zero − Starting Life in Another World, Alice Zuberg in Sword Art Online).

Deaths

January
 January 5: Joop Du Buy, Dutch animator, textile salesman, and comics artist (worked for Nederland Film during World War II), dies at age 59.
 January 8: Pat Buttram, American actor (voice of Napoleon in The Aristocats, the Sheriff of Nottingham in Robin Hood, Luke in The Rescuers, Chief in The Fox and the Hound, Cactus Jake in Garfield and Friends), dies at age 78. 
 January 28: Hal Smith, American actor (voice of Owl in Winnie the Pooh, Goliath in Davey and Goliath, Flintheart Glomgold and Gyro Gearloose in DuckTales, continued voice of Goofy, Elmer Fudd, and Winnie the Pooh), dies at age 77.

February 
 February 1: Olan Soule, American actor (voice of Batman in The Adventures of Batman, Sesame Street, The New Scooby-Doo Movies, and Super Friends, Master Taj in Fantastic Planet, the Boy's Father in The Small One, Martin Stein in Super Friends: The Legendary Super Powers Show), dies at age 84.
 February 6: Jack Kirby, American comics artist and animator (Fleischer Studios, Hanna-Barbera, Ruby-Spears), dies at age 76.
 February 8: Raymond Scott, American composer, dies at age 85.
 February 11: 
William Conrad, American actor (voice of the narrator in Rocky and Bullwinkle), dies at age 73.
Sorrell Booke, American actor (voice of Boss Hogg in The Dukes, Mayor Fist in The Pound Puppies, Sheriff Rufus and TJ Buzby in Scooby-Doo Meets the Boo Brothers, Big Daddy Boo in Tiny Toon Adventures: How I Spent My Vacation, Pinky in Rock-a-Doodle, Boss Hoss in the Bonkers episode "Love Stuck", Sheriff Hebbs in The New Adventures of Captain Planet episode "Jail House Flock"), dies at age 64.
 February 17: Lou Bunin, American puppeteer and animator (Alice in Wonderland), dies from a stroke at age 89.
 February 24: Dinah Shore, American singer and actress (sang the "Two Silhouettes" segment in Make Mine Music, and narrated and sang the "Bongo the Bear" segment in Fun and Fancy Free), dies at age 77.

March
 March 4: John Candy, Canadian comedian and actor (voice of Den, Dan, Desk Sergeant and Robot in Heavy Metal, Wilbur in The Rescuers Down Under, himself in Camp Candy), dies from a heart attack at age 43. 
 March 10: Reuben Timmins, American animator and comics artist (Fleischer Studios, Van Beuren Studios, Terrytoons, Walt Disney Company, Hanna-Barbera, Tom & Jerry, Crusader Rabbit, Peanuts, Fat Albert and the Cosby Kids), dies at age 84.
 March 22: Walter Lantz, American comics artist and animator (Andy Panda, Woody Woodpecker), dies at age 94.
 March 29: Paul Grimault, French animator and film director (Le Roi et l'oiseau), dies at age 89.
 March 31: José Escobar Saliente, Spanish animator, comics writer and artist, dies at age 85.

May
 May 25: Sonny Sharrock, American jazz guitarist and composer (Space Ghost Coast to Coast), dies from a heart attack at age 53.

June
 June 10: Jack Hannah, American animator, film director, screenwriter, and comic writer and artist (Walt Disney Animation Studios, Walter Lantz), dies at age 81.
 June 12: Christopher Collins, American actor (voice of Starscream in The Transformers, Cobra Commander in G.I. Joe: A Real American Hero, Mr. Burns and Moe Szyslak in season 1 of The Simpsons), dies at age 44.
 June 14: Henry Mancini, American composer and conductor (The Pink Panther Theme, The Great Mouse Detective, Tom and Jerry: The Movie), dies at age 70.
 June 23: Piet van Elk, Dutch comics artist and animator (Stripfilm, Hanna-Barbera), dies at age 74.
 June 28: Richard Bickenbach, American animator and comics artist (Ub Iwerks, Warner Bros. Cartoons, MGM, Hanna-Barbera), dies at age 86.

July
 July 23: Owen Fitzgerald, American animator and comics artist (Walt Disney Company, Fleischer Studios, Warner Bros. Cartoons, DePatie-Freleng, Hanna-Barbera), dies at age 77.
 July 26: Terry Scott, English actor (voice of Penfold in Danger Mouse), dies from cancer at age 67.

August
 August 1: Augstí Ascensio Saurí, Spanish animator and comics artist (El mago de los sueños), dies in a car accident at age 45.
 August 4: Stanislav Látal, Czech puppeteer, animator and film director (Adventures of Robinson Crusoe, a Sailor from York), dies at age 75.
 August 24: Rickie Sorensen, American actor (voice of Spotty in 101 Dalmatians, Arthur in The Sword in the Stone), dies at age 47.

September
 September 1: Thomas Chastain, American author (co-wrote The Simpsons episode "Black Widower"), dies from lung cancer at age 73.

October
 October 3: Dub Taylor, American actor (voice of Digger in The Rescuers), dies at age 87. 
 October 5: Doug Wildey, American comics artist and animator (Jonny Quest), dies at age 72.

November
 November 2: Martin Taras, American comics artist and animator (Fleischer Studios, Famous Studios, Hanna-Barbera, Terrytoons, Ralph Bakshi) and character designer (Baby Huey), dies at age 80.
 November 5: Nikolay Fyodorov, Russian animator, film director and cartoonist (co-director of The Snow Queen), dies at age 80.
 November 18: Cab Calloway, American jazz singer and dancer (voiced singing characters in the Betty Boop shorts Minnie the Moocher, Snow White, The Old Man of the Mountain), dies at age 86.
 November 23: Irwin Kostal, American musical arranger (Walt Disney Animation Studios, Charlotte's Web), dies at age 83.
 November 30: Lionel Stander, American actor (voice of Buzz Buzzard in Woody Woodpecker, Kup in The Transformers: The Movie), dies at age 86.

Specific date unknown
 Izzy Ellis, American animator (Warner Bros. Cartoons, Paramount Cartoon Studios, Hanna-Barbera), dies at age 83 or 84.
 Ray Johnson Jr., American animator (Bebe's Kids), storyboard artist (The Get Along Gang, Bobby's World, Rocko's Modern Life, Rugrats, Aaahh!!! Real Monsters) and layout artist (Hanna-Barbera, The Simpsons), dies at an unknown age.

See also
1994 in anime

Sources

External links 
Animated works of the year, listed in the IMDb

 
1990s in animation